is a compilation album by X Japan, released June 17, 2014. Prior to its physical release, a digital version titled X Japan World Best became available in 111 countries via iTunes on May 21.  It contains the band's hit songs from their major label career, as well as a live performance of the hide tribute song Without You for the first time. The Japanese version includes Amethyst from The Last Live. The album reached number 2 on the Oricon main chart, and was certified gold by RIAJ in 2016.

Track listing

References 

Hatsu no Zensekai Best
2014 compilation albums